Green Model Town is a housing project straddling the boundary between Demra and Khilgaon Thanas of Dhaka District, Bangladesh.

Geography
It is bounded on the south by the Matuail landfill and its waste treatment pond, and on the west by Manda Khal, a canal into which the landfill discharges its effluent. Houses built on pillars encroach on the canal area, and are even built in the middle of the canal. With no access by land, the latter are reachable only by boat.

References

Further reading
 
 
 
 

Populated places in Dhaka Division